Causton Bluff is a cliff located in Chatham County, Georgia. 

The community was named after Thomas Causton, an aide to colonial governor James Oglethorpe. Variant names are "Caustens Bluff" and "Caustons Bluff".

References

Landforms of Chatham County, Georgia
Cliffs of the United States